Karl Flink (7 December 1895 – 28 November 1958) was a German international footballer.

References

1895 births
1958 deaths
Association football midfielders
German footballers
Germany international footballers